Nimocks House may refer to:

in the United States (by state)
Hawkins-Nimocks Estate-Patricio Ontiveros Adobe, Santa Fe Springs, California, listed on the National Register of Historic Places in Los Angeles County, California
Nimocks House (Fayetteville, North Carolina), listed on the National Register of Historic Places in Cumberland County, North Carolina
Nimocks House (Wellington, Ohio), listed on the National Register of Historic Places in Lorain County, Ohio